Šiauliai County is one of ten counties in Lithuania. It is in the north of the country, and its capital is Šiauliai. On 1 July 2010, the county administration was abolished, and since that date, Šiauliai County remains as the territorial and statistical unit.

History 
Formation of administrative regions in Lithuania started in the Grand Duchy of Lithuania in the 18th century.

In October 1795, Catherine II of Russia granted Šiauliai the city rights and the privilege to become the capital town of the region. Administrative division of Russian Empire remained unchanged up to the end of World War I. When the war came to its end, in 1918 Lithuania was restored as an independent state.

On December 17, 1918, a circular No.1 was issued "On Municipalities in Lithuania" that declared that the entire area of Lithuania would be divided into the regions - apskritys (county sometimes translated into English as a provinces or counties). There were 10 apskritys in Lithuania.

In 1937 Siauliai county's overall territory was 6042 km² and 210 thousands people lived there. It was the largest apskritis in Lithuania.

In 1940 the Soviet Union occupied Lithuania and reformed the administrative system. The county system remained until 1950 when the counties were abolished and entire area was divided into smaller units - districts, or rajonas in Lithuanian.

Only in 1994 - four years after the restoration of Lithuania's independence in 1990 - the apskritys were created again. However, the interwar apskritys should not be mixed with current apskritys, as their purpose, sizes, and number are all different, see administrative division of Lithuania. The entire area of Lithuania is currently divided into 10 larger units - apskritys and smaller districts, consisting of urban and rural elderships.

Municipalities
The County encompasses municipalities of:

References

External links 
Social and demographic characteristics of Šiauliai County
Economy of Šiauliai County
Environment of Šiauliai County
Šiauliai Region Main Post Office

 
Counties of Lithuania